Silence Is Easy is the second studio album by English indie rock group Starsailor, released in September 2003 on EMI Records. The album cover is loosely based on Echo & the Bunnymen's Heaven Up Here. The song "Some of Us" was featured in an episode of Bones titled "A Boy in a Bush" and in the closing credits of the Belgian film The Memory of a Killer (a.k.a. The Alzheimer Case). The album contains some of the last productions by Phil Spector before his murder conviction and imprisonment in 2009, and before his death in 2021 ("Silence Is Easy" and "White Dove"). The album sold 54,296 copies in its opening week of release, charting at No. 2 on the UK Albums Chart. It was certified gold in the UK in 2003.

Critical reception
Silence Is Easy was met with "mixed or average" reviews from critics. At Metacritic, which assigns a weighted average rating out of 100 to reviews from mainstream publications, this release received an average score of 53 based on 16 reviews.

In a review for AllMusic, critic reviewer Matt Collar wrote: "Mixing alternative rock aesthetics with a melodic pop sensibility, Silence Is Easy finds the band in pretty much the same place as before with slightly better songwriting, a more mature vocal performance by Walsh, and tastefully grandiose production. The 11 tracks here, including the two Spector-produced numbers, are heartfelt, melodic rockers with some string backgrounds that fit well into the overall aesthetic of cinematic pop romanticism." At Drowned in Sound, Gareth Dobson gave an unfavourable three out of ten score to the release, calling it a "perfected brand of middle-class miserablism". Caroline Sullivan of The Guardian called the album "attractive listening, and it's hard not to be moved by its tenderness."

Writing for Pitchfork, John O'Connor wrote: "Starsailor revels in all of these romantic pretensions on Silence Is Easy, their melodramatic, overproduced, but not altogether unpleasant sophomore release. Defiantly sappy, Silence Is Easy survives mostly on Walsh's oddly graceful singing. Unfortunately, the music on the whole is prosaic, even boring at times."

Playlouder ranked it at number eight on their list of the 20 worst albums of the year.

Track listing

Personnel

 Ben Byrne – drums
 James 'Stel' Stelfox – bass guitar
 James Walsh – vocals, guitar
 Barry Westhead – keyboards
 Percussion: Luis Jardim
 Double bass: Arnulf Lindner
 Violins: Ruth Gottilieb, Gillon Cameron, Howard Gott, Wendy De St Paer, louise Peacock, Brian Wright, Claire Raybould, Katherine Watmough, Tim Myall, Anna Giddey, Catherine Browning, Alison Blunt, Calina De La Mare, Anna Morris, Gini Ball and Sally Herbert
 Violas: Rob Spriggs, Vince Greene, Sophie Sirota, Emily Frith, Lucy Theo and Fiona Friffith
 Cellos: Sarah Willson, Helen Thomas, Andy Nice, Ian Burdge and Emily Isaac

Production
 Producer: Danton Supple, Starsailor, John Leckie, Mark Aubrey, Phil Spector
 Engineer: Danton Supple, Mark Aubrey, John Leckie and Chris Brown
 Additional engineer: Britt Myers
 Programmer John Dunne
 Mixer: Michael H. Brauer, The Soulsavers
 Assistance: Nathaniel Chan
 Mastering: Greg Calbi, Miles Showell
 String arrangements: Leo Abrahams
 Art direction: Yacht Associates
 Photograph: Rick Guest

Charts

Weekly charts

Year-end charts

Certifications

References

Starsailor (band) albums
2003 albums
Albums produced by Phil Spector
Albums arranged by Leo Abrahams
Albums produced by John Leckie
EMI Records albums